is a Japanese speed skater. He competed at the 1992 Winter Olympics, the 1994 Winter Olympics and the 2002 Winter Olympics.

References

1974 births
Living people
Japanese male speed skaters
Olympic speed skaters of Japan
Speed skaters at the 1992 Winter Olympics
Speed skaters at the 1994 Winter Olympics
Speed skaters at the 2002 Winter Olympics
Sportspeople from Hokkaido
Asian Games medalists in speed skating
Speed skaters at the 1999 Asian Winter Games
Medalists at the 1999 Asian Winter Games
Asian Games gold medalists for Japan
20th-century Japanese people
21st-century Japanese people